Alsophila semiamplectens, synonym Cyathea semiamplectens, is a species of tree fern in north-eastern New Guinea at 3300 to 3590 metres. Its trunk is 1 to 2 metres tall. The stipe is covered by thin scales. The scales are either having a dark middle band and fragile edges or are pale all over. Fronds are bi- or tripinnate and 1–2 m long.

References

semiamplectens
Endemic flora of New Guinea